116 (one hundred and sixteen) may refer to:

116 (number)
AD 116
116 BC
116 (Devon and Cornwall) Engineer Regiment, Royal Engineers, a military unit
116 (MBTA bus)
116 (New Jersey bus)
116 (hip hop group), a Christian hip hop collective
116 emergency number, see List of emergency telephone numbers
116 emergency telephone number in California
116 helplines in Europe
Route 116, see list of highways numbered 116

See also

11/6 (disambiguation)

Livermorium, synthetic chemical element with atomic number 116